is a 2016 judgment of the Supreme Court of the United Kingdom that provided an interpretation of section 2 to the Riot (Damages) Act 1886.

Facts
The case concerns an incident that took place during the 2011 England riots. On 8 August 2011 a gang broke into a warehouse owned by Sony DADC in Enfield. After stealing goods from the warehouse they proceeded to start a fire that destroyed the warehouse and the goods that remained inside.

The insurers, Mitsui Sumitomo Insurance Group, made a claim under section 2 of the Riot (Damages) Act 1886 but a dispute arose surrounding the quantification of loss. The MOPC argued that compensation should only extend to the physical damage whereas the insurers argued that it should also include consequential damages.

Judgment

High Court
The High Court held that section 2 only provided for compensation for the physical damage suffered and not any consequential loss of profits or rent.

Court of Appeal
The Court of Appeal reversed the decision of the High Court and held that section 2 provided a right to compensation for all heads of loss. The Master of the Rolls, Lord Dyson stated:

Supreme Court
In the lead judgment Lord Hodge emphasised that the Riot (Damages) Act 1886 must be considered in the context of previous legislative history. Compensation following a riot was first provided for by Parliament in the Riot Act 1714 and although the scope of compensation was not defined; subsequent case law made it clear that "statutory compensation was confined to physical damage to property." On this basis the Supreme Court unanimously allowed the appeal by the MOPC.

Aftermath
In the wake of the 2011 riots it was felt that the wording of the Riot (Damages) Act 1886 was archaic and therefore created uncertainty as regards interpretation. As such section 10 of the Riot Compensation Act 2016 repealed the Riot (Damages) Act 1886. Furthermore, section 8(2) of the 2016 Act now makes it clear that compensation will not generally extend to consequential damages.

Reaction
The law firm that represented the MOPC in the case stated that "With many claims for consequential loss dependent on the outcome of this case, today's Supreme Court decision will likely save the UK taxpayer upwards of £80m."

See also
2011 England riots
Timeline of the 2011 England riots
Riot (Damages) Act 1886
2016 Judgments of the Supreme Court of the United Kingdom

References

External links
Supreme Court judgment
Video of the judgment

Supreme Court of the United Kingdom cases
2016 in British law
2011 England riots
Looting
Riots in London
2011 in the United Kingdom
Arson in the United Kingdom
MS&AD Insurance Group
Sony